Aysun is a common unisex Turkish given name. In Turkish, "Aysun" means "(a person) whose face is as beautiful as the moon".

People
 Aysun, son of Sulayman al-Arabi
 Aysun Aliyeva (born 1997), Azerbaijani women's footballer
 Aysun Boyacı (born 1972), Turkish women's footballer, football manager and teacher
 Aysun Kayacı (born 1981), Turkish model and actress
 Aysun Özbek (born 1977), Turkish volleyball player

Fictional characters
 Aysun, in Follow Kadri, Not Your Heart

Turkish unisex given names